Jashpur District is a district of the central Indian state of Chhattisgarh bordering Jharkhand and Odisha. Jashpur Nagar is the administrative headquarters of the district. The district was formerly a princely state before Indpendence. Highly mountainous and forested, Jashpur is known for its natural environment.

Shri Ritesh Agrawal is the District Collector and Magistrate of Jashpur. He has previously served as DM Bijapur, CEO Zila Panchayat Bilaspur, Bastar, Dhamtari & Gariyaband.

History
During the British Raj Jashpur town was the capital of Jashpur State, one of the princely states of the Eastern States Agency. Merged with independent India in 1948, the last king before Independence was Vijay Bhushan Singh Ju Deo.

Geography

The north-south length of this district is about 150 km, and its east-west breadth is about 85 km. Its total area is 6,205 km². It is between 22° 17′ and 23° 15′ North latitude and 83° 30′ and 84° 24′ East longitude. Geographical area was 6701 km². It is bordered by Balrampur district to the north, Gumla district of Jharkhand to the east, Simdega district of Jharkhand and Sundergarh district of Odisha to the southeast, Raigarh district to the southwest and Surguja district to the west.

It is divided geographically into two parts. The northern hilly belt is called the Upper Ghat. The remaining, southern part, is called Nichghat.

The upper ghat runs from Loroghat Kastura, Narayanpur, Bagicha up to Surguja and Balrampur districts. This belt is a forest area and contains a reserve forest. It covers Sanna, Bagicha, and Narayanpur. The upper ghat is an extension plateau covering 1384 km² which is about 1200 meters above sea level and is covered by a dense forest. The elevated plateau is called "Pat". The Upper Ghat is climbed through Loroghat. Loroghat is about 4 km in length and there are three turnings that are very dangerous.

Nichghat is flat in general but also has many big mountains. In Jashpur Raigarh road there are two more ghats, Jhanda ghat before Kansabel and Belaghat after Kansabel.

Major rivers in the Mahanadi basin are Ib and its tributaries such as Dorki, Maini, Kokiya, Utai, Khadung, Girma and Burhi. In the eastern part, rivers named Baki and Lava Nadi flow in the Brahmani basin. Lower Ganges part is mainly drained by Geor and Kanhar rivers. The drainage pattern is dendritic and is highly irregular, which is reflective of the topography. Irregular topography results in huge base flow through the streams and less recharge.

Towns
The main towns situated on the national highway (N.H.78) are Lodam, Gholeng, and Jashpur in the Upper ghat and Kunkuri, Bandarchuwan, Kansabel, Ludeg, and Pathalgaon. The roads running from Jashpur H.Q are:

 Jashpur Ranchi.
 Jashpur Ambikapur via Manora, Kusmi (170).
 Jashpur Ambikapur via Sanna Bagicha (170 km). These 2 and 3 are not the all-weather road.
 Jashpur Ambikapur via Kunkuri, Patthalgaon (200 km).
 Jashpur Ambikapur via Nrayanpur Baghicha.

Climate
Kunkuri is the hottest region in Nichghat during the summer and Pandrapat is the coldest region in Upper Ghat in the winter. It is situated between forests. It is a junction, from Raigarh and from Ambikapur or Jashpur all the people need to cross Patthalgaon first.

Weather record
|location = Jashpur District (1998–2015)

Soil
Yellow soils (Ultisols)
and red soils (Alfisols)
developed over the granitoids
occupy most part of the district
Black soils (Inceptisols) have
formed over the deccan traps in small patches.

Geology and Hydrology
Most part of the District is covered by granitoids. A small portion in the
northwestern part is occupied by the Deccan Traps and Lametas. Almost
the entire area has a thick laterite cover.
Nearly 90% of the area in the district is covered with granitoids, which include
granite gneiss, chlorite-biotite gneiss, muscovite granite, granodiorite etc. Remaining area
is occupied by Deccan Traps and Lametas. The entire has a thick carapace of laterite.
Thickness of laterite cover varies from a few metres to more than 30m at several places.
Broadly the area can be divided into 4 hydro-stratigraphic units viz. Laterite, Granitoids,
Deccan Traps and Lametas.

Geomorphology

i) Major Physiographic Units - The northern hilly areas can be
categorised as structural hills
and the relatively plain areas in
the southern part can be
categorised as pediplains.

ii) Major Drainage - Mahanadi basin occupies nearly 71% area in the central part, Bramhani basin covers 21% area in the eastern part
and Lower Ganges basin
spreads over an area of 8% in
the northern part of the district.

Demographics

According to the 2011 census Jashpur district has a population of 851,669, roughly equal to the nation of Qatar or the US state of South Dakota. This gives it a ranking of 473rd in India (out of a total of 640). Its population growth rate over the decade 2001-2011 was 14.65%. Jashpur has a sex ratio of 1004 females for every 1000 males, and a literacy rate of 68.6%. 8.92% of the population lives in urban areas. Scheduled Castes and Scheduled Tribes make up 5.73% and 62.28% of the population respectively.

Languages

At the time of the 2011 Census of India, 48.83% of the population in the district spoke Sadri, 27.57% Kurukh, 10.28% Chhattisgarhi, 5.11% Odia, 4.98% Hindi and 1.36% Bhojpuri as their first language.

References

7. GOVT. Of INDIA Ministry Of Water Resources Central Ground Water Board
8. One of the important information page in facebook about jashpur. https://www.facebook.com/JashpurNagarcg/

External links
 

 
Districts of Chhattisgarh